Harry Chase may refer to:

Harry Chase (artist) (1853–1889), American painter
Harry B. Chase (born 1947), Canadian politician in the Alberta legislature
Harrie B. Chase (1889–1969), judge of the United States Court of Appeals for the Second Circuit 
Harry Woodburn Chase (1883–1955), American university president

See also
Henry Chase (disambiguation)